Witpoort is a suburb of Midrand in Gauteng, South Africa, just west of Blue Hills. It is located in Region A of the City of Johannesburg Metropolitan Municipality. It was the site of the Battle of Witpoort during the Second Boer War.

References

Johannesburg Region A
Suburbs of Johannesburg